Talipao, officially the Municipality of Talipao (Tausūg: Kawman sin Talipao), is a 1st class municipality in the province of Sulu, Philippines. According to the 2015 census, it has a population of 80,255 people.

Etymology
The municipality of Talipao derived its name from a certain couple, “Tal” and “Pao”, that of the husband's and wife's name respectively.

History
From the district of Jolo, it was transformed into a full-pledged municipality on July 1, 1957, under the provision of the Department of Mindanao and Sulu Administrative Code. On March 7, 1984, Talipao was renamed as  Arolas Tulawie by virtue of Batas Pambansa Blg. 692 but was rejected in a plebiscite.

Geography
The Municipality of Talipao's total area coverage is approximately 497.32 square kilometres or 49,732 hectares. This constitute more or less 20.63% of Sulu's total land area. It is bounded on the north by the municipality of Patikul; on the south by Sulu Sea; on the east by the municipality of Panglima Estino; and by the municipality of Maimbung on its west side.

The municipality of Talipao lies right in the mid portion of Jolo island with its Barangay Poblacion basically situated in the innermost central part of the municipality.

Barangays
Talipao is politically subdivided into 52 barangays.

Climate

Demographics

Economy

References

External links

[ Philippine Standard Geographic Code]
  Talipao Profile at the DTI Cities and Municipalities Competitive Index
Philippine Census Information
Local Governance Performance Management System

Municipalities of Sulu